The Calgary Roughnecks are a lacrosse team based in Calgary playing in the National Lacrosse League (NLL). The 2010 season was the 9th in franchise history. 

Despite winning the Champion's Cup last season, the Roughnecks lost both their head coach and an assistant coach to the Toronto Rock. Former assistant coach Terry Sanderson resigned and was hired as the Rock's new GM, and Sanderson immediately persuaded his former boss in Calgary Troy Cordingley to take the job of head coach of the Rock. Assistant coach Dave Pym was named the new Roughnecks head coach. In addition, former player Curt Malawsky announced his retirement from playing and was hired as both Assistant General Manager and Assistant Coach.

Regular season

Conference standings

Game log
Reference:

Playoffs

Game log
Reference:

Transactions

New players
 Craig Conn - acquired in trade
 Rob Kirkby - returning from retirement
 Craig Gelsvik - returning from retirement

Players not returning
 Curt Malawsky - retired

Trades

Entry draft
The 2009 NLL Entry Draft took place on September 9, 2008. The Roughnecks selected the following players:

Roster

See also
2010 NLL season

References

Calgary